Pierre Montallier (c. 1643 – 15 October 1697 Paris) was a French painter. He died in Paris. His most famous artwork is Works of Mercy.

References

1643 births
1697 deaths
17th-century French painters
French male painters